

Hugh Saddler has a degree in science from Adelaide University and a PhD from Cambridge University. He is the author of a book on Australian energy policy, Energy in Australia and over 50 scientific papers, monographs and articles on energy technology and environmental policy, and is recognised as one of Australia's leading experts in this field.

Hugh Saddler is currently a member of the Experts Group on Emissions Trading, appointed by the Australian Greenhouse Office, of the ABS Environmental Statistics Advisory Group, and of the ACT Environment Advisory Committee. In 1998 he was appointed an adjunct professor at Murdoch University. He is a Fellow of the Australian Institute of Energy and a member of the International Association for Energy Economics.

Hugh Saddler founded the company Energy Strategies in 1982 and is its Managing Director.

See also

Trevor Lee (architect)
Renewable energy commercialization in Australia

References

Bibliography
Saddler, Hugh (1981). Energy in Australia : politics and economics, Sydney: George Allen & Unwin Australia.

External links
A clean energy future for Australia
Australian Financial Review article
Australia's energy choices
Canberra Times article
Clean energy future

Australian non-fiction writers
Living people
Year of birth missing (living people)
Energy economists
People associated with renewable energy
University of Adelaide alumni
Alumni of the University of Cambridge